Room and board is a way of compensating a person for their work.

Room and board may also refer to:

Room & Board, an American furniture company
Room and Board (film), a 1921 American silent film starring Constance Binney
Room and Board (comic strip), a comic strip by Gene Ahern